Louis Edmond Duranty (6 June 1833 – 9 April 1880) was a prolific French novelist and art critic.

Duranty supported the realist cause and later the Impressionists.  He was challenged to a duel in 1870 by Édouard Manet over an affront.  He was a friend of Edgar Degas, who painted a celebrated portrait of him in 1879 (Burrell Collection, Glasgow). He was a frequent visitor to the Café Guerbois.

Duranty adopted 'truth' as the slogan of his short-lived journal Réalisme (1856–57), and in the second volume he composed principles of realism. Duranty is the author of The New Painting.

References

External links

Degas: The Artist's Mind, exhibition catalog from The Metropolitan Museum of Art fully available online as PDF, which contains material on Louis Edmond Duranty (see index)

1833 births
1880 deaths
French art critics
Burials at Père Lachaise Cemetery
19th-century French journalists
Male journalists
19th-century French novelists
French male novelists
19th-century French male writers
French male non-fiction writers
French duellists